The Waterloo Forest Reserve is found in Sierra Leone, Africa. 

This site is 0.85 km².

References

Forest reserves of Sierra Leone